HMS Howe (pennant number 32) was the last of the five British King George V-class battleships of the Royal Navy. Built by Fairfield Shipbuilding and Engineering Company, she was laid down on 1 June 1937 and launched 9 April 1940. She was originally to have been named Beatty but this was changed to Howe, after Admiral Richard Howe.

Howe was completed on 29 August 1942 after her building time was extended, as supplies were diverted to work of a higher priority such as the construction and repair of merchant ships and escort ships. Like her sister-ship , Howe spent most of her career in the Arctic providing cover for Russian convoys.

In 1943, Howe took part in Operation Husky and bombarded Trapani naval base and Favignana in support of the Allied landings. Howe was also sent to the Pacific and attached to the British Pacific Fleet (Task Force 113), where she provided naval bombardments for the Allied landings at Okinawa on 1 April 1945.

After the war, Howe spent four years as flagship of the Training Squadron at Portland, before she was placed in reserve in 1950. The battleship was marked for disposal in 1957, sold for scrap in 1958 and broken up by 1961.

Construction
In the aftermath of the First World War, the Washington Naval Treaty was drawn up in 1922 in an effort to stop an arms race developing between Britain, Japan, France, Italy and the United States. This treaty limited the number of ships each nation was allowed to build and capped the tonnage of all capital ships at 35,000 tons. These restrictions were extended in 1930 through the Treaty of London, however, by the mid-1930s Japan and Italy had withdrawn from both of these treaties and the British became concerned about a lack of modern battleships within their navy. As a result, the Admiralty ordered the construction of a new battleship class: the King George V class. Due to the provisions of both the Washington Naval Treaty and the Treaty of London, both of which were still in effect when the King George Vs were being designed, the main armament of the class was limited to the  guns prescribed under these instruments. They were the only battleships built at that time to adhere to the treaty and even though it soon became apparent to the British that the other signatories to the treaty were ignoring its requirements, it was too late to change the design of the class before they were laid down in 1937.

The keel of Howe, the last ship of the King George V class, was laid on 1 June 1937 at the Fairfield Shipyard in Govan. She was originally to have been named HMS Beatty, after Admiral David Beatty, commander of the British battlecruiser squadron at the Battle of Jutland, but the name was changed to HMS Howe, after Admiral Richard Howe.  Howe was launched on 9 April 1940 and completed on 20 August 1942. She carried improved anti-aircraft armament and radar equipment as a result of lessons already learned in World War II.

Design

Howe displaced  as built and  fully loaded.

The ship was powered by Parsons geared steam turbines, driving four propeller shafts. Steam was provided by eight Admiralty 3-drum water-tube boilers, which normally delivered  but could produce  at emergency overload. The ship carried  of fuel oil.

Armament 

Howe mounted 10 BL  Mk VII guns. The 14-inch guns were mounted in one Mark II twin turret forward and two Mark III quadruple turrets, one forward and one aft. The guns could be elevated 40 degrees and depressed 3 degrees. Training arcs were: turret "A", 286 degrees; turret "B", 270 degrees; turret "Y", 270 degrees. Training and elevating was done by hydraulic drives, with rates of two and eight degrees per second, respectively. The secondary armament consisted of 16 QF  Mk I guns which were mounted in eight twin mounts, weighing 81 tons each. The guns could be elevated to 70 degrees and depressed to 5 degrees. The nominal rate of fire was ten to twelve rounds per minute, but in practice the guns could only fire seven to eight rounds per minute. Upon commissioning, along with her main and secondary batteries, Howe carried 48 QF 2 pdr  Mk.VIII "pom-pom" anti-aircraft guns and 18  Oerlikon AA guns

Operational history

Home Fleet

Howe joined the Home Fleet on 30 August 1942, her building time extended, owing to more urgent demands of the industry. Like her sister ship Anson, she spent the early years of her combat career in Arctic waters, covering convoys bound for Russia. On 31 December 1942, Howe and her sister ship  provided distant cover for convoy RA 51, which safely arrived in Loch Ewe on 9 January 1943. Howe and King George V also provided distant cover for convoy RA 53 on 1 March 1943 and helped to recover merchantmen whose ships had been sunk. In 1943  Howe was transferred to Gibraltar with King George V to take part in Operation Husky, the Allied invasion of Sicily; the US battleships Alabama and South Dakota substituted for their absence from the Home Fleet. The two British ships shelled Trapani naval base and Favignana during 11–12 July. Based in Algiers, the pair also offered cover during Operation Avalanche—the Allied landings at Salerno—setting out on 7 September. On 14 September Howe and King George V escorted the surrendered Italian battleships Vittorio Veneto and Italia to Alexandria.

By the end of October 1943, Howe and King George V had returned to Britain. At the end of year, Howe underwent a long overhaul at Devonport, where a number of alterations were made. Her anti-aircraft armament was increased, changes were made to her radar, and her watertight integrity in the stern was improved. Modifications were accomplished in the officers and crew quarters for operations in tropical climates; these included changes in insulation, and the extensive use of air-conditioning equipment.

Pacific operations 

On 8 August 1944, Howe arrived at Trincomalee in Ceylon to join the Eastern Fleet.  She was the first modern British battleship to be deployed in eastern waters since the loss of Prince of Wales in December 1941. Howe was put into action quickly, providing cover for carrier based air operations against targets in Sumatra. In December she moved to Sydney, where she sailed to Auckland, New Zealand, to show the flag. In February 1945, Howe and King George V sailed from Sydney to begin operations in earnest in the Pacific theatre; together with four carriers, five cruisers and fifteen destroyers, they made up Task Force 113.

The first major undertaking for Task Force 113 (now redesignated TF.57) was Operation Iceberg—offshore support for the US landings at Okinawa—which got under way on 1 April 1945. The force was subjected to sporadic Japanese kamikaze attacks, but the two ships emerged unscathed from these actions. Howe's anti-aircraft batteries also succeeded in shooting down an attacking kamikaze plane. The two ships' principal roles were air defence and land bombardment, the latter being carried out very accurately, particularly by Howe against anti-aircraft installations on the island of Miyako, half way between Okinawa and Formosa.

Post war 

By the first week of June 1945, Howe was back in Sydney, and almost immediately it was decided to send her for a refit in Durban. It was here that she saw out the remainder of the war. She was relocated back to Portsmouth by January 1946. In 1951, Howe was placed in reserve and towed to Devonport. She was ordered scrapped in 1957. On 27 May 1958, Howe was towed to Inverkeithing to be broken up by Thos. W. Ward. The Royal Navy presented the ship's bell to St Giles' Cathedral in Edinburgh. In 2012, it was reported that parts from one of the gun turrets may still exist, having been re-used as a turntable at Dounreay nuclear laboratory.

Refits 
During her career, Howe was refitted on several occasions to bring her equipment up to date:

Artefacts

A large model of HMS Howe, from her builder around the time she was laid down, is on display in the Riverside Museum in Glasgow.

References

Notes

Citations

Bibliography

External links

 Maritimequest HMS Howe Photo Gallery

 

King George V-class battleships (1939)
Ships built on the River Clyde
World War II battleships of the United Kingdom
1940 ships